The Tomb of Aaron is the name of the supposed burial place of Aaron, the brother of Moses, according to Jewish, Christian, and local Muslim tradition.

There are two different places named in the Torah as Aaron's place of death and burial, Mount Hor and Moseroth (Mosera), and there are different interpretations for the location of each of the two. Jews have considered the mountain near Petra now known in Arabic as Jebel Harun as biblical Mount Hor at least since the time of Josephus (see Antiquities of the Jews IV:IV,7). Christians have adopted this identification since the Byzantine period and have built at the time a monastery acting as a pilgrimage centre there. The local Muslim tradition places Aaron's tomb at the same site, although there is at least one other local tradition locating it in Sinai. There used to be a rich repertoire of general and local Muslim legends regarding Aaron's tomb.

This article deals only with the site near Petra in southern Jordan.

History and description
The current building’s history dates back to the Mamluk era during the beginning of the 14th century. The mausoleum consists of a room and a small courtyard. It has a white dome covering the entirety of the main room. Above the door of the shrine is the date of its last medieval renewal, the Islamic year of 719 AH (Year 1320 of the Christian calendar). The shrine has been sacred for Islam since the Nabateans inhabited Petra. Ruins of a Christian monastery from the Byzantine era are also close by.

The shrine of the Prophet Aaron is located at the highest point in Petra at an altitude of 1350 m and the myths of its construction are primarily recorded by the locals.

The site consists of two buildings: the first was built with dimensions of 13.2 m × 22.6 m on the basilica plan, and it consists of a central hall and two wings, divided from the inside by two rows of columns, each consisting of seven columns, which were later replaced by pillars. The distance between the columns was about 2.50 m, and the structure has an inner semicircular mihrab with two side rooms, so that the mihrab and the choir rise two steps above the level of the shrine. When the shrine was destroyed in an unknown event, it was rebuilt and changes were made to it, including placing supports instead of columns. At this stage, the floor of the mihrab and the choir were raised. The length of the shrine was shortened by a wall. The courtyard was paved with colors of sandstone in marble. 

Near to the main building follows the ruins of an old Byzantine chapel. The ruins reveals a structure with a hall of 6.40 m × 16 m with internal doors. It is located to the north of the shrine. It may have been built in the 4th century or a later period. The church follows two courtyards around which rooms are located. The northern part was most likely a resting place for pilgrims.

The church is part of a monastery with an area of 75 m × 45 m, where the clergy's seats were located and also the seat of the chief clergyman's chair. These seats belong to the first building, while there are also stone benches at the entrance to the church that were increased in the later stages. Marble pieces from the temple barrier and a column from the barrier were also found in the place. In the remains, there are also floors and mosaics that has been dated from the 6th century AD. The paintings included hunting scenes of animal predators and geometric forms.

Location
The Pentateuch gives two accounts of Aaron's death. The Book of Numbers (Chapter 20) gives a detailed statement to the effect that, soon after the incident at Meribah (Kadesh), when Moses and Aaron showed impatience by bringing water out of a rock to quench the thirst of the people after God commanded them to speak to the rock, Aaron, his son Eleazar, and Moses ascended Mount Hor, on the edge of the borders of Edom. There, Moses stripped Aaron of his priestly garments and gave them to Eleazar. Aaron died and was buried on the summit of the mountain, and the people mourned for him thirty days.

Mount Hor is usually associated with the mountain near Petra in Jordan, known in Arabic as Jabal Hārūn (Aaron's Mountain), upon the summit of which a mosque was built in the 14th century. Indeed, Josephus and Eusebius both describe its location above the city of Petra.

The other account is found in the Book of Deuteronomy, where Moses is reported as saying that Aaron died at Moseroth (Mosera) and was buried there. Mosera is sometimes identified with el-Tayibeh, a small fountain at the bottom of the pass leading to the ascent of Jebel Harun. However others are of the opinion that the location of Mosera cannot be here, since the itinerary in  records seven stages between Mosera and Mount Hor. For similar reasons, others still doubt that Mount Hor can in reality be identified with Jabal Hārūn.

Religious status
The site at Jabal Hārūn is occasionally visited by both Jewish pilgrims and Muslims.

Jordanian authorities regard the Tomb of Aaron as a mosque and forbid Jewish prayer services at the site. In August 2019, a group of Israeli tourists shared a video of themselves dancing with a Torah scroll at the site. Authorities then confiscated religious items from the group and closed the summit to foreign tour groups that do not have permission to visit from the Awqaf Ministry. Unrestricted access to the tomb was restored in December. Israel has a regulated tourism mechanism directly with the Jordanian government.

See also
Mount Hor
Petra
Prophet Aaron

References

Tourism in Jordan
Aaron
Aaron
Mosques in Jordan
Sinai Peninsula
Aaron
Jews and Judaism in Jordan
Christianity in Jordan